Aulocyathus is a genus of cnidarians belonging to the family Caryophylliidae.

The genus has almost cosmopolitan distribution.

Species:

Aulocyathus atlanticus 
Aulocyathus juvenescens 
Aulocyathus matricidus 
Aulocyathus recidivus

References

Caryophylliidae
Scleractinia genera